Otis Barthoulameu (born 1962 or 1963, died February 16, 2023) was an American rock musician and record producer. He performed with a number of bands including Fluf, Olivelawn, and Reeve Oliver, and produced early Blink-182 releases.

Notes

References

External links
 

2023 deaths
American rock musicians
American record producers